Hermann Giesler (2 April 1898, Siegen – 20 January 1987, Düsseldorf) was a German architect during the Nazi era, one of the two architects most favoured and rewarded by Adolf Hitler (the other being Albert Speer).

Early life and World War II

Hermann Giesler completed his architectural study at the Academy for Applied Arts in Munich. Starting from 1930 he worked as an independent architect. In 1933 he became master of building of districts in Sonthofen and 1937, became a professor.

Up to 1938 he designed the "Ordensburg" in Sonthofen, planned Gau Forums in Weimar and Augsburg, and the "university" for the NSDAP at Chiemsee. Also, Giesler refurbished different buildings (such as the "Hotel of the Elephant" in Weimar). In addition, he was commissioned to build Hitler's house in Munich.

In 1938 he was ordered by Hitler to the "General Building Inspector" for the reorganization of the city of Munich. Later he became also a director in the Organisation Todt, then one of the directors of the Group of Works of VI (Bavaria, Donaugaue).

Starting in 1941, after fellow architect Roderich Fick fell out of political favour, Giesler was entrusted by Hitler with the reorganization of the entire city of Linz. Beginning from 1942 he worked on plans and a large model for the Danube Development of the Banks. In August 1943, Giesler became a member of the Reichstag. Starting from 1944, he also worked on designs for the cultural center, which Hitler regarded with particular interest.

Giesler joined the Nazi Party in 1941 in Organisation Todt (OT) as head of the "Assembly for the Baltic States Giesler", as head of the Einsatzgruppe Russia North of the OT (1942–1944), and as Director of the OT-Einsatzgruppe VI (Bayern und Danube gaue). Concentration camp prisoners built weapons in the underground factories (1944-1945).

Throughout the war, Giesler and Speer had several heated arguments about architectural styles.  In September 1944 Giesler was named one of the Reich's most important artists in the Gottbegnadeten list.

After the war

In 1945, Giesler was initially arrested by the U.S. military and interned as a Nazi, and charged in 1946. In 1947, he was indicted by a U.S. military court for war crimes in the concentration camp Mühldorf, a subcamp of Dachau. Giesler was sentenced to life imprisonment, but on 6 May 1948 his sentence was reduced to 25 years imprisonment. On 7 July 1951, it was lowered once again to twelve years. Giesler was freed on 18 October 1952. He settled in Düsseldorf, where he worked in 1953 as an independent architect and author. Giesler published his autobiographical writings, which appeared both in right-wing publishers (see below), as a commitment to Nazism and Adolf Hitler. Giesler wrote Ein anderer Hitler (Another Hitler), a personal memoir about his relationship with the dictator.
He died in 1987.

Literature
Another Hitler. Report of architect Hermann Giesler. Experiences, discussions, reflections. Druffel Verlag, Leoni on the Starnberger Lake 1978  and 
Addendum. From unpublished writings. Hermann Giesler. (Ed. Hermann and Dietrich p. Giesler), Heater & Halifa, Essen 1988 
Michael Früchtel: The architect Hermann Giesler. Life and work (1898-1987). Edition of Altavilla, Tübingen 2008,  (studies from the Institute of architectural history, art history, restoration with Museum of architecture, Technical University Munich, Faculty of architecture), (at the same time: Munich, tech. Univ., Diss., 2007).
Hartmut Happel: Allgäuer Ordensburg in Sonthofen. Eberl, Immenstadt 1996, 
Francis Albert Heinen: NS houses Vogelsang, Sonthofen, Krössinsee, ch. links Verlag, Berlin 2011 
Peter Müller: The bunker site in the Mühldorfer Hart . Obsession with arms and human suffering. Home Federal, Mühldorf am Inn 1999, .
Ulrich Friedrich Obed: Siegerland and Wittgenstein in Nazi Germany. People, data, literature. A guide to the regional history. 2. revised edition. History workshop, WINS 2001,  (Siegen posts.) Special volume 2001).
Edith RAIM: The Dachau concentration camp outside commands Kaufering and Mühldorf. Fort buildings and forced labor in the last war year of 1944/45 Landsberger Verlagsanstalt, Landsberg am Lech, 1992,  (at the same time: Munich, Univ., Diss., 1991).
Roberto Spazzali: Sotto la Todt. Affari, service obbligatorio del lavoro, deportazioni nella zona d ' utilisation "Litorale adriatico". (1943–1945). Libreria Editrice Goriziana, Gorizia, 1998,  (I leggeri-9), (to work in the southern area of responsibility of the OT group leader Hermann Giesler;) Mühldorf).
Gerdy Troost: Building during the new Kingdom. Volume 1 Publisher of Gau Bayreuth Bayreuth, 1938.
Siegerland national-Zeitung. 29 October, 8 November, 14 December 1938. Central Office in Ludwigsburg, Germany, "Excerpt from the list of war crimes", 51, without signature
Ernst Klee: The cultural lexicon to the Third Reich. Who was what before and after 1945? S. Fischer, Frankfurt am Main, 2007, p. 183.

References

External links
 The Artist Within the Warlord - An Adolf Hitler You've Never Known at Archive.org 
^ https://www.flickr.com/photos/horizonte_weimar/4763792488

1898 births
1987 deaths
20th-century German architects
Architects in the Nazi Party
Members of the Reichstag of Nazi Germany
People from Siegen